Amy Wright is a name shared by several notable people, including:

 Amy Wright (born 1950), American actress and former model
 Amy Wright (activist) (21st Century), American advocate for disabled people
 Amy Wright (curler) (born 1964), American curler
 Amy Wright (writer) (20th Century), American writer